Karla Klarić (born 5 September 1994) is a Croatian volleyball player. She plays as outside hitter.

Club career 
In 2022, she played for the Israeli club Maccabi Haifa.

International career 
She is a member of the Croatia women's national volleyball team. She competed at the 2021 Women's European Volleyball League winning a silver medal.

References

External links
Karla Klarić at CEV.eu
Karla Klarić profile at Volleybox

1994 births
Living people
Croatian women's volleyball players
Wing spikers
Sportspeople from Zagreb
Expatriate volleyball players in Switzerland
Expatriate volleyball players in Romania
Expatriate volleyball players in France
Expatriate volleyball players in Hungary
Expatriate volleyball players in Greece
Expatriate volleyball players in Japan
Expatriate volleyball players in Israel
Croatian expatriate sportspeople in Romania
Croatian expatriate sportspeople in Switzerland
Croatian expatriate sportspeople in France
Croatian expatriate volleyball players
Mediterranean Games bronze medalists for Croatia
Mediterranean Games medalists in volleyball
Competitors at the 2013 Mediterranean Games
Volleyball players at the 2015 European Games
European Games competitors for Croatia
21st-century Croatian women